Gedi is a village and former non-salute princely state on Saurashtra peninsula in Gujarat, western India.

History
The petty princely state in Jhalawant prant was ruled by Jhala Rajput Chieftains.

It 1901, it comprised two villages, with a population of 574, yielding 4,500 Rupees of state revenue (1903-4, mostly from land), paying 1,389 Rupees tribute, to the British and Junagadh State.

References

Princely states of Gujarat
Rajput princely states